Kay Boyle (February 19, 1902 – December 27, 1992) was an American novelist, short story writer, educator, and political activist. She was a Guggenheim Fellow and O. Henry Award winner.

Early years
The granddaughter of a publisher, Boyle was born in St. Paul, Minnesota, and grew up in several cities but principally in Cincinnati, Ohio. Her father, Howard Peterson Boyle, was a lawyer, but her greatest influence came from her mother, Katherine Evans, a literary and social activist who believed that the wealthy had an obligation to help the financially less fortunate. In later years Kay Boyle championed integration and civil rights. She advocated banning nuclear weapons, and American withdrawal from the Vietnam War.

Boyle was educated at the exclusive Shipley School in Bryn Mawr, Pennsylvania, then studied architecture at the Ohio Mechanics Institute in Cincinnati. Interested in the arts,  she studied violin at the Cincinnati Conservatory of Music before settling in New York City in 1922 where she found work as a writer/editor with a small magazine.

Marriages and family life
That same year, she met and married a French exchange student, Richard Brault, and they moved to France in 1923. This resulted in her staying in Europe for the better part of the next twenty years. Separated from her husband, she formed a relationship with magazine editor Ernest Walsh, with whom she had a daughter, Sharon, named for the Rose of Sharon, in March 1927, five months after Walsh's death from tuberculosis in October 1926.

In 1928 she met Laurence Vail, who was then married to Peggy Guggenheim. Boyle and Vail lived together between 1929 until 1932 when, following their divorces, they married. With Vail, she had three more children - daughters Apple-Joan in 1929, Kathe in 1934, and Clover in 1939. During her years in France, Boyle was associated with several innovative literary magazines and made friends with many of the writers and artists living in Paris around Montparnasse. Among her friends were Harry and Caresse Crosby who owned the Black Sun Press and published her first work of fiction, a collection titled Short Stories. They became such good friends that in 1928 Harry Crosby cashed in some stock dividends to help Boyle pay for an abortion. Other friends included Eugene and Maria Jolas. Boyle also wrote for transition, one of the preeminent literary publications of the day. A poet as well as a novelist, her early writings often reflected her lifelong search for true love as well as her interest in the power relationships between men and women. Boyle's short stories won two O. Henry Awards.

In 1936, she wrote a novel, Death of a Man, an attack on the growing threat of Nazism. In 1943, following her divorce from Laurence Vail, she married Baron Joseph von Franckenstein, with whom she had two children - Faith in 1942 and Ian in 1943. After having lived in France, Austria, England, and in Germany after World War II, Boyle returned to the United States.

McCarthyism, later life
In the States, Boyle and her husband were victims of early 1950s McCarthyism. Her husband was dismissed by Roy Cohn from his post in the Public Affairs Division of the United States Department of State, and Boyle lost her position as foreign correspondent for The New Yorker, a post she had held for six years. She was blacklisted by most of the major magazines. During this period, her life and writing became increasingly political.

She and her husband were cleared by the United States Department of State in 1957.

In the early 1960s, Boyle and her husband lived in Rowayton, Connecticut, where he taught at a private girls' school.  He was then rehired by the State Department and posted to Iran, but died shortly thereafter in 1963.

Boyle was a writer in residence at the New York City Writer's Conference at Wagner College in 1962. In 1963, she accepted a creative writing position on the faculty of San Francisco State College, where she remained until 1979.

During this period she became heavily involved in political activism. She traveled to Cambodia in 1966 as part of the "Americans Want to Know" fact-seeking mission. She participated in numerous protests, and in 1967 was arrested twice and imprisoned. In 1968, she signed the "Writers and Editors War Tax Protest" pledge, vowing to refuse tax payments in protest against the Vietnam War. In her later years, she became an active supporter of Amnesty International and worked for the NAACP. After retiring from San Francisco State College, Boyle held several writer-in-residence positions for brief periods of time, including at Eastern Washington University in Cheney and the University of Oregon in Eugene.

Boyle died at a retirement community in Mill Valley, California on December 27, 1992.

Legacy
In her lifetime Kay Boyle published more than 40 books, including 14 novels, eight volumes of poetry, 11 collections of short fiction, three children's books, and French to English translations and essays. Most of her papers and manuscripts are in the Morris Library at Southern Illinois University in Carbondale, Illinois. Morris Library has the Ruby Cohn Collection of Kay Boyle Letters and the Alice L. Kahler Collection of Kay Boyle Letters. A comprehensive assessment of Boyle's life and work was published in 1986 titled Kay Boyle, Artist and Activist by Sandra Whipple Spanier. In 1994 Joan Mellen published a voluminous biography of Kay Boyle, Kay Boyle: Author of Herself.

A member of the American Academy of Arts and Letters, in addition to her two O. Henry Awards, she received two Guggenheim Fellowships and in 1980 received the National Endowment for the Arts fellowship for "extraordinary contribution to American literature over a lifetime of creative work".

Bibliography

Novels
Process (written in 1925, unpublished until 2001 )
Plagued by the Nightingale (1931)
Year Before Last (1932)
Gentlemen, I Address You Privately (1933)
My Next Bride  (1934)
Death of a Man  (1936)
Yellow Dusk (Bettina Bedwell) (ghostwritten) (1937)
Monday Night  (1938)
The Crazy Hunter: Three Short Novels (The Crazy Hunter, The Bridegroom's Body, and Big Fiddle) (1940)
Primer for Combat  (1942)
Avalanche  (1944)
A Frenchman Must Die  (1946)
1939 (1948)
His Human Majesty  (1949),
The Seagull on the Step (1955)
Three Short Novels (The Crazy Hunter,The Bridegroom's Body, Decision) (1958)
Generation Without Farewell  (1960)
The Underground Woman  (1975)
Winter Night (1993)

Story collections
Short Stories (1929)
Wedding Day and Other Stories (1930)
The First Lover and Other Stories  (1933)
The White Horses of Vienna (1935) winner of the O. Henry Award
The Astronomer's Wife (1936)
Defeat (1941), winner of the O. Henry Award
Thirty Stories  (1946)
The Smoking Mountain: Stories of Postwar Germany (1951)
Nothing Ever Breaks Except the Heart  (1966)
Fifty Stories  (1980)
Life Being the Best and Other Stories (1988)

Juvenile
The Youngest Camel (1939), revised edition published as The Youngest Camel: Reconsidered and Rewritten (1959)
Pinky, the Cat Who Liked to Sleep (1966)
Pinky in Persia (1968)

Poetry collections
A Statement (1932)
A Glad Day (1938)
American Citizen: Naturalized in Leadville (1944)
Collected Poems  (1962)
The Lost Dogs of Phnom Pehn (1968)
Testament for My Students and Other Poems (1970)
A Poem for February First (1975)
This Is Not a Letter and Other Poems  (1985)
Collected Poems of Kay Boyle (Copper Canyon Press, 1991)

Non-fiction
Relations & Complications. Being the Recollections of H.H. The Dayang Muda of Sarawak. (1929), Forew. by T.P. O'Connor (Gladys Milton Brooke) (ghost-written) 
Breaking the Silence: Why a Mother Tells Her Son about the Nazi Era (1962)
The Last Rim of The World in "Why Work Series" (1966)
Being Geniuses Together, 1920-1930 (1968; with Robert McAlmon)
Winter Night and a conversation with the author in New Sounds In American Fiction (1969)
The Long Walk at San Francisco State and Other Essays (1970)
Four Visions of America (1977; with others)
Words That Must Somehow Be Said (edited by Elizabeth Bell; 1985)

Translations 

 Don Juan, by Joseph Delteil (New York: Jonathan Cape and Harrison Smith, 1931)
 Mr Knife, Miss Fork, by René Crevel (Paris: Black Sun Press, 1931). A fragment of Babylon translated into English.
 The Devil in the Flesh, by Raymond Radiguet (Paris: Crosby Continental Editions, 1932)
 Babylon, by René Crevel (San Francisco: North Point Press, 1985)

References

External links
 Modern American Poetry
 New York review of books, articles by Kay Boyle
 WOSU Presents Ohioana Authors | Kay Boyle
 Kay Boyle Collection at the Harry Ransom Center at the University of Texas at Austin
 Manuscripts and correspondence in Southwest Collection/Special Collections Library at Texas Tech University
 Kay Boyle Papers, 1914-1987 at Southern Illinois University Carbondale, Special Collections Research Center
 
 Kay Boyle addresses The New York Herald Tribune Book and Author Luncheon as heard on WNYC, March 14, 1960. Boyle speaks starting at 2:35.
 "The Teaching of Writing," an essay, at Narrative Magazine.

1902 births
1992 deaths
Writers from Cincinnati
20th-century American novelists
American women short story writers
American women poets
MacDowell Colony fellows
Modernist women writers
O. Henry Award winners
American tax resisters
University of Cincinnati alumni
American women novelists
20th-century American women writers
20th-century American poets
20th-century American short story writers
Novelists from Ohio
Shipley School alumni
Members of the American Academy of Arts and Letters